Debarya may refer to:
 Debarya, a genus of algae in the family Zygnemataceae, synonym of Transeauina
 Debarya, a genus of fungi in the family Hypocreaceae, synonym of Hypocrea